The Boudoir Diplomat is a 1930 American pre-Code romantic comedy film directed by Malcolm St. Clair, produced and distributed by Universal Pictures, from the play The Command To Love by Fritz Gottwald and Rudolph Lothar.

The film is preserved at the Library of Congress.

Plot
Ian Keith plays a French military attaché in Madrid who romantically pursues the wives of various government officials. Betty Compson and Mary Duncan play the objects of his attention.

Release
The film opened to much fan-fare on December 5, 1930. According to Mordaunt Hall's review of the film, the lobby in New York's showcase theater, the Globe, was elaborately decorated for the film's run "with pink silk and photographs with violet borders."

Alternate Version
The film was remade during production into three alternate-language versions. Boudoir diplomatique was the French-language version, starring Iván Petrovich and Arlette Marchal. It was directed by Marcel De Sano and released in 1931, and is not likely to have been screened publicly in the United States. A Spanish-language version of Boudoir Diplomat was released on February 13, 1931 as Don Juan diplomático. It was co-directed by George Melford (he would direct the 1931 Spanish-language version of Drácula) with Enrique Tovar Ávalos, and starred Miguel Faust Rocha, Lia Torá and Celia Montalván. Liebe auf Befehl, co-directed by Johannes Riemann and Ernst L. Frank, was the German-language version, starring Riemann along with Tala Birell and Olga Chekhova.

References

External links
 
 
 

1930 films
American black-and-white films
Films set in Madrid
American romantic comedy films
1930 romantic comedy films
American films based on plays
Films directed by Malcolm St. Clair
American multilingual films
1930 multilingual films
1930s American films